The 1981 Nova Scotia general election was held on October 6, 1981, to elect members of the 53rd House of Assembly of the Province of Nova Scotia, Canada. It was won by the Progressive Conservative party.

Results

Results by party

Results by region

Retiring incumbents
Liberal
Benoit Comeau, Clare

Nominated candidates
Legend
bold denotes party leader
† denotes an incumbent who is not running for re-election or was defeated in nomination contest

Valley

|-
|bgcolor=whitesmoke|Annapolis East
||
|Gerry Sheehy3,70056.40%
|
|Hugh Laurence2,00630.58%
|
|Joan M. Boutilier85413.02%
|
| 
||
|Gerry Sheehy
|-
|bgcolor=whitesmoke|Annapolis West
||
|Greg Kerr2,78453.57%
|
|Herb Anderson1,89436.44%
|
|John R. Taylor5199.99%
|
|
||
|Greg Kerr
|-
|bgcolor=whitesmoke|Clare
|
|Guy LeBlanc2,17338.00%
||
|Chester Melanson2,22838.96%
|
|Paul Denis Comeau1,31723.03%
|
|
||
|Benoit Comeau†
|-
|bgcolor=whitesmoke|Digby
|
|John Comeau2,64341.70%
||
|Joseph H. Casey2,91846.04%
|
|Bill Redden77712.26%
|
|
||
|Joseph H. Casey
|-
|bgcolor=whitesmoke|Hants West
||
|Ron Russell4,55451.51%
|
|Daniel J. McGrath2,66130.10%
|
|Alan Squires1,62618.39%
|
|
||
|Ron Russell
|-
|bgcolor=whitesmoke|Kings North
||
|Edward Twohig3,36943.61%
|
|Lennie White2,04126.42%
|
|Bob Levy2,31629.98% 
|
|
||
|Edward Twohig
|-
|bgcolor=whitesmoke|Kings South
||
|Harry How4,35665.47%
|
|Betty Deal93314.02%
|
|Evelyn Garbary1,36420.50%
|
|
||
|Harry How
|-
|bgcolor=whitesmoke|Kings West
||
|George Moody5,28659.43%
|
|Dan Weir2,25925.40%
|
|Carolyn Queen1,34915.17%
|
|
||
|George Moody 
|}

South Shore

|-
|bgcolor=whitesmoke|Argyle
|
|Peter J. Boudreau2,09239.32%
||
|Hugh Tinkham2,87253.97%
|
|Roy Sonny Murphy3576.71%
|
| 
||
|Hugh Tinkham Yarmouth
|-
|bgcolor=whitesmoke|Lunenburg Centre
||
|Bruce Cochran5,37454.40%
|
|Alan V. Parish3,35533.96%
|
|Neil Theriault1,15011.64%
|
|
||
|Bruce Cochran
|-
|bgcolor=whitesmoke|Lunenburg East
||
|Ron Barkhouse2,80255.49%
|
|Dave Cook1,18023.37%
|
|Janet Mooney1,06821.15%
|
|
||
|Ron Barkhouse
|-
|bgcolor=whitesmoke|Lunenburg West
||
|Mel Pickings3,87553.66%
|
|Pauline Himmelman2,31932.11%
|
|Carl E. Simpson1,02714.22%
|
|
||
|Mel Pickings
|-
|bgcolor=whitesmoke|Queens
||
|John Leefe4,11465.19%
|
|Mervin W. Hartlen1,51123.94%
|
|David K. Sampson68610.87%
|
|
||
|John Leefe 
|-
|bgcolor=whitesmoke|Shelburne
|
|Warren Doane3,44042.21%
||
|Harold Huskilson3,76546.20%
|
|Laurie Hitchens94511.60%
|
|
||
|Harold Huskilson 
|-
|bgcolor=whitesmoke|Yarmouth 
|
|Benoit Robichaud3,38940.39%
||
|Fraser Mooney3,86846.10%
|
|Hartley Wickens1,13413.51%
|
| 
||
|Fraser Mooney
|}

Fundy-Northeast

|-
|bgcolor=whitesmoke|Colchester North
|
|Bill Campbell3,17142.40%
||
|Ed Lorraine3,18242.55%
|
|Allan Marchbank1,12615.06%
|
|
||
|Bill Campbell
|-
|bgcolor=whitesmoke|Colchester South
||
|R. Colin Stewart3,28156.48%
|
|Laurence Mersereau Nason1,68328.97%
|
|Chester Rice79913.75%
|
|Bob Kirk460.79%
||
|R. Colin Stewart
|-
|bgcolor=whitesmoke|Cumberland Centre
|
|Arthur L. Brennan1,46933.86%
||
|Guy Brown2,57959.45%
|
|Florence Welton2906.69%
|
|
||
|Guy Brown
|-
|bgcolor=whitesmoke|Cumberland East
||
|Roger Stuart Bacon4,66353.08%
|
|Shelagh Frances Rayworth2,41327.47%
|
|Hal Davidson1,70919.45%
|
|
||
|Roger Stuart Bacon
|-
|bgcolor=whitesmoke|Cumberland West
||
|D. L. George Henley2,74554.12%
|
|Bartley Babineau1,71733.85%
|
|Doug Meekins61012.03%
|
|
||
|D. L. George Henley
|-
|bgcolor=whitesmoke|Hants East
|
|G. Patrick Hunt2,98338.39%
||
|Jack Hawkins3,04139.13%
|
|Harry McNeil1,74722.48%
|
|
||
|G. Patrick Hunt
|-
|bgcolor=whitesmoke|Truro—Bible Hill
||
|Ron Giffin5,02461.55%
|
|Sylvia Roy2,09725.69%
|
|Tom Barron1,04112.75%
|
|
||
|Ron Giffin 
|}

Central Halifax

|-
|bgcolor=whitesmoke|Halifax Bedford Basin
||
|Joel Matheson6,08749.41%
|
|John Genik3,24026.30%
|
|Peter Delefes2,99324.29%
|
|
||
|Joel Matheson
|-
|bgcolor=whitesmoke|Halifax Chebucto
|
|Dugger McNeil3,39435.04%
|
|Walter Fitzgerald2,40724.84%
||
|Alexa McDonough3,88640.12%
|
|
||
|Walter Fitzgerald
|-
|bgcolor=whitesmoke|Halifax Citadel
||
|Art Donahoe4,14144.55%
|
|Brenda Shannon2,69028.94%
|
|Tom Sinclair-Faulkner2,46526.52%
|
|
||
|Art Donahoe 
|-
|bgcolor=whitesmoke|Halifax Cornwallis
||
|Terry Donahoe4,92746.79%
|
|Dean Salsman2,86727.22%
|
|Michael Coyle2,73725.99%
|
|
||
|Terry Donahoe
|-
|bgcolor=whitesmoke|Halifax Needham
||
|Edmund L. Morris3,30038.05%
|
|Dan Clarke2,80132.30%
|
|Phil Davis2,57229.66%
|
|
||
|Edmund L. Morris
|}

Suburban Halifax

|-
|bgcolor=whitesmoke|Bedford-Musquodoboit Valley
||
|Ken Streatch4,92957.62%
|
|Dwight Isenor2,24626.26%
|
|Bruce Carroll1,37916.12%
|
|
||
|Ken Streatch
|-
|bgcolor=whitesmoke|Halifax Atlantic
||
|John Buchanan6,02360.29%
|
|Roma J. Aiken1,74417.46%
|
|Rene Quigley2,10821.10%
|
|Art Canning1151.15%
||
|John Buchanan
|-
|bgcolor=whitesmoke|Halifax-St. Margaret's
||
|Jerry Lawrence4,86050.26%
|
|Helena Poirier2,61727.06%
|
|Lillian Viau2,19322.68%
|
|
||
|Jerry Lawrence 
|-
|bgcolor=whitesmoke|Sackville
||
|Malcolm A. MacKay4,68742.55%
|
|Murdock MacKay3,47831.58%
|
|John Holm2,84925.87%
|
|
||
|Malcolm A. MacKay
|}

Dartmouth/Cole Harbour/Eastern Shore

|-
|bgcolor=whitesmoke|Cole Harbour
||
|David Nantes4,60551.20%
|
|Rae Austin2,22924.78%
|
|Steve MacDonald2,16024.02%
|
|
||
|David Nantes
|-
|bgcolor=whitesmoke|Dartmouth East
||
|Richard L. Weldon4,25342.51%
|
|Jim Smith3,35133.50%
|
|Gerry Legere2,40023.99%
|
|
||
|Richard L. Weldon
|-
|bgcolor=whitesmoke|Dartmouth North
||
|Laird Stirling3,92546.17%
|
|Don Valardo2,41928.46%
|
|Mark Flannigan2,15725.37%
|
|
||
|Laird Stirling
|-
|bgcolor=whitesmoke|Dartmouth South
||
|Roland J. Thornhill4,21546.81% 
|
|Will Chisholm2,46327.35%
|
|John Lewis Bregante2,32725.84%
|
|
||
|Roland J. Thornhill 
|-
|bgcolor=whitesmoke|Halifax Eastern Shore
||
|Tom McInnis5,63959.32% 
|
|Angus MacNeil2,30224.22%
|
|Bruce Beasley1,56516.46%
|
|
||
|Tom McInnis
|-
|}

Central Nova

|-
|bgcolor=whitesmoke|Antigonish 
|
|Angus MacIsaac4,27143.90%
||
|Bill Gillis4,52246.47%
|
|John Arthur Murphy9379.63%
|
|
||
|Bill Gillis 
|-
|bgcolor=whitesmoke|Guysborough
|
|Jim Johnson3,11942.76%
||
|A.M. "Sandy" Cameron3,72351.03%
|
|Art Livingston4536.21%
|
|
||
|A.M. "Sandy" Cameron
|-
|bgcolor=whitesmoke|Pictou Centre
||
|Jack MacIsaac6,67359.62%
|
|Tom DeWolfe2,63423.53%
|
|Kim Murray1,88516.84%
|
|
||
|Jack MacIsaac 
|-
|bgcolor=whitesmoke|Pictou East
||
|Donald Cameron4,34760.88%
|
|Harold Lowe1,83325.67%
|
|Hasse Lindblad96013.45%
|
|
||
|Donald Cameron
|-
|bgcolor=whitesmoke|Pictou West
||
|Donald P. McInnes3,47353.24%
|
|Doris Rink2,06631.67%
|
|Jim Scanlan70210.76%
|
|Franklin R. Fiske2824.32%
||
|Donald P. McInnes 
|}

Cape Breton

|-
|bgcolor=whitesmoke|Cape Breton Centre
||
|Mike Laffin3,27639.49%
|
|Art MacDonald2,20826.62%
|
|Buddy MacEachern2,81233.90%
|
|
||
|Buddy MacEachern
|-
|bgcolor=whitesmoke|Cape Breton East
||
|Donnie MacLeod4,69945.55%
|
|Shelly McNeil3,05329.59%
|
|Joe Kanary1,84917.92%
|
|Blair Matheson7166.94%
||
|Donnie MacLeod 
|-
|bgcolor=whitesmoke|Cape Breton North
||
|Brian Young4,18743.51%
|
|Nash Brogan3,12832.51%
|
|Len J. Arsenault2,30723.98%
|
|
||
|Len J. Arsenault
|-
|bgcolor=whitesmoke|Cape Breton Nova
|
|Russell Brake1,48719.42%
|
|Earle Tubrett2,30730.13%
|
|Tony Gale1732.26%
||
|Paul MacEwan3,69148.20%
||
|Paul MacEwan
|-
|bgcolor=whitesmoke|Cape Breton South
|
|Murray Hannem3,82432.16%
||
|Vince MacLean6,63355.78%
|
|Linda Gallant1,43512.07%
|
|
||
|Vince MacLean 
|-
|bgcolor=whitesmoke|Cape Breton—The Lakes
|
|John Newell3,31641.51%
||
|Ossie Fraser3,43643.01%
|
|Douglas D. MacDonald1,23715.48%
|
|
||
|Ossie Fraser
|-
|bgcolor=whitesmoke|Cape Breton West
||
|"Big" Donnie MacLeod4,12542.59%
|
|David Muise3,73538.56%
|
|Elizabeth Cusack Walsh1,82618.85%
|
|
||
|David Muise
|-
|bgcolor=whitesmoke|Inverness North
|
|Daniel Rankin3,16042.17%
||
|John Archie MacKenzie3,77050.31%
|
|Eleanor Joyce Gillis5647.53%
|
|
||
|John Archie MacKenzie Inverness
|-
|bgcolor=whitesmoke|Inverness South
||
|Billy Joe MacLean2,46946.82%
|
|William MacEachern2,40745.65%
|
|Bill Martin3977.53%
|
|
||
|William MacEachern Inverness
|-
|bgcolor=whitesmoke|Richmond
||
|Greg MacIsaac3,17346.03%
|
|John E. LeBrun2,82140.93%
|
|Shirley McNamara89913.04%
|
|
||
|John E. LeBrun
|-
|bgcolor=whitesmoke|Victoria
||
|Fisher Hudson2,35750.02%
|
|Merrill D. Buchanan1,95241.43%
|
|Frank Reid2515.33%
|
|Duncan J. Beaton1523.23%
||
|Fisher Hudson
|}

References

Further reading 
 

1981
Nova Scotia general election
General election
Nova Scotia general election